Mahankali is a 2013 Indian Telugu-language action drama film directed by Jeevitha Rajasekhar starring her husband Rajasekhar in the titular role.

The film released on 8 March 2013. The film was dubbed into Tamil as Ithu Thaanda Police 2.

Cast 
Rajasekhar as Mahankali
Madhurima as Tanisha
Pradeep Rawat as Harshad Bhai
Kalakeya Prabhakar as Nayak Bhai
Chalapathi Rao as Anand Rao (Police Commissioner)
Nalini as Jayalakshmi alias Jayakka (Politician), Harshad's Proxy 
Supreeth Reddy
Vinod Kumar as DCP
Salim Panda as Salim
Chatrapathi Sekhar as Ramakrishna alias RK
Satya Prakash as Laddu
Narsing Yadav as Raheem

Production 
While shooting a chase sequence, Rajasekhar was severely injured and the film's shoot was halted. The delay of the film shoot by the director reportedly increased the cost of the film. Home Minister Sabitha Indra Reddy attended the film's trailer launch as the chief guest.

Soundtrack 
The music was composed by Chinna.

Release and reception 
The film was initially scheduled to release in February 2013.

Sushil Rao of The Times of India rated the film two out of five stars and said that "Killing. Killing. And killing. That is the only thing that happens all through the movie". A critic from 123 Telugu said that "Mahankaali is a routine and boring cop saga". Bojja Kumar of Filmibeat said that the film is only for Rajasekhar fans.

References

External links

Indian action drama films
2010s Telugu-language films